Warren Crandall Giles (May 28, 1896 – February 7, 1979) was an American professional baseball executive. Giles spent 33 years in high-level posts in Major League Baseball as club president and general manager of the Cincinnati Reds (1937–1951) and president of the National League (1951–1969), and was elected to the National Baseball Hall of Fame.

Born in Tiskilwa, Illinois, Giles attended Washington & Lee University and served as an infantry officer in France during World War I. Before becoming a full-time baseball executive, he worked as a football and basketball official in the Missouri Valley Conference, a major U.S. college sports league.

President/GM of the Cincinnati Reds
Giles was elected president of the Moline, Illinois, Plowboys baseball club in the Class B Three-I League at age 23 in 1919, beginning his 50-year career in baseball.

He then joined the St. Louis Cardinals' organization and rose to prominence as the president and business manager of their top-level farm teams, the Syracuse Stars (1926–1927) and Rochester Red Wings (1928–1936) of the International League. As a foreshadowing of his most powerful position in professional baseball, Giles spent part of the 1936 season as president of the International League.

Upon the recommendation of Cardinals' executive Branch Rickey, Powel Crosley Jr., owner of the Cincinnati Reds, appointed Giles as his club's general manager on November 1, 1936, succeeding Larry MacPhail. While the 1937 Reds won only 56 games and slid into the basement of the National League, the  edition improved by 26 games to finish in the first division, earning Giles the 1938 Major League Executive of the Year award from The Sporting News.  That season, he hired a future Hall of Fame manager, Bill McKechnie, to take charge of the Reds on the field. Then, on June 13, 1938, Giles swung one of the most successful trades in Cincinnati history, when he obtained starting pitcher Bucky Walters from the Philadelphia Phillies for catcher Spud Davis, pitcher Al Hollingsworth and cash. 

The 1939 Reds, behind Walters' 27 victories and MVP-Award-winning season, captured the NL pennant by  games, but they were swept by the New York Yankees in the World Series. Unfazed, the 1940 Reds won 100 games, with Walters accounting for 22 victories and leading the circuit in earned run average for a second straight season. They repeated as league champions by a 12-length margin, then, behind Walters' two complete game victories, they defeated the Detroit Tigers in a seven-game World Series for the second world title in modern club history.

Nevertheless, Giles was a leading candidate to become baseball's third commissioner after Happy Chandler was fired in 1951. He was runner-up in the commissioner balloting to Ford Frick but succeeded Frick as president of the National League on October 8, 1951.

National League president
During his 18-year reign as chief executive of the Senior Circuit (including the full seasons of 1952–1969), Giles presided over several historic events.

Giles' first full season, had been the last in which the eight-team league operated in the same cities as it had since . In March 1953, the Braves pulled up stakes in Boston, where they had played since 1876 as a charter member of the National League, and moved to Milwaukee. That transfer—initially wildly successful, although the Braves would stay in Milwaukee only 13 seasons before settling in Atlanta—was the first in the series of franchise moves that shook Major League Baseball for the next two decades.

Although "who says you have to have a team in New York?" was Giles' notorious reply when asked if his league would seek to replace the Dodgers and Giants in New York City, the 1962 expansion, which created the Mets, returned the Senior Circuit to the city after a four-year absence. The same expansion brought Major League Baseball to Texas and the Southwest, with the Houston Colt .45s. In 1969, Giles' last year in office, his league expanded into Canada with the Montreal Expos, adopted divisional play, and played the first National League Championship Series, between the Braves and Mets. Between 1952 and 1969, the NL's member clubs, with the exception of the Chicago Cubs, also opened or were planning to open new stadiums. 

Giles' presidency also saw the National League widen its advantage over the American League in the signing of African-American and Latin American players, resulting in a three-decade-long domination of the Major League Baseball All-Star Game. In clubhouse meetings before the midsummer classic, Giles famously would exhort the NL's players to uphold their league's honor. During his tenure, the National League won 16 of 22 All-Star games played, with one tie. (Two games were played each year from 1959 to 1962.) The NL also won ten of 18 World Series during Giles' term.

In addition, Giles worked vigorously to keep premier players in his league. After the advent of interleague trading without waivers in November 1959, he lobbied against the trade of National League superstars to the American League to preserve the NL's hegemony. He was successful until his former team, the Reds, traded Frank Robinson to the Baltimore Orioles after the 1965 season. Under Giles, the National League began a 33-year (1956–1988) streak during which it dominated the American League in attendance—a remarkable achievement, given that the Junior Circuit had two more member teams than the NL during 13 of those seasons (in 1961 and 1977–1988).

During the early weeks of the  season, Giles became a figure of some controversy after he instructed the NL's umpires to strictly enforce the balk rule then in place. In response, the Senior Circuit's arbiters called 74 balks from the opening of the season on April 8 until April 26, when Giles announced a relaxation of the policy. Only two balks were called in the American League over the same period.

Giles, then 73, announced his intention to retire after the  season and on December 5, Giants' executive Chub Feeney was elected to succeed him. Under Feeney, league president through , the NL's All-Star Game dominance would continue, with 14 triumphs in 17 games.

Hall of Fame honors

Giles is interred in Riverside Cemetery in Moline, Illinois.

The National League Championship Series trophy is named in his honor. Also, Minor League Baseball gives out the Warren Giles Award to outstanding minor league presidents.

His son, Bill, has also had lengthy baseball career. After serving as an executive with the Reds, Houston Colt .45s/Astros and Phillies, he became a part-owner of the Phillies in 1981, and served as their club president until 1997 before becoming board chairman and then chairman emeritus. Following in his father's footsteps, Bill Giles is also honorary president of the National League.

References

External links

Warren Giles – Baseball Biography and Highlights

1896 births
1979 deaths
United States Army personnel of World War I
Cincinnati Reds executives
Major League Baseball executives
Major League Baseball general managers
Major League Baseball team presidents
Minor league baseball executives
National Baseball Hall of Fame inductees
National League Championship Series
National League presidents
People from Moline, Illinois
Sportspeople from Cincinnati